Bobby James is an American football coach.  He is currently the Head Football Coach at East Henderson High School in Hendersonville, North Carolina.

From 2014 to 2015, James was the first head coach in history of the program at Limestone College in Gaffney, South Carolina.

Head coaching record

References

External links
 Temple profile

Year of birth missing (living people)
Living people
American football defensive backs
Drake Bulldogs football coaches
Bloomsburg Huskies football coaches
Bloomsburg Huskies football players
Lenoir–Rhyne Bears football coaches
Limestone Saints football coaches
New Haven Chargers football coaches
Susquehanna River Hawks football coaches
Temple Owls football coaches
Wilkes Colonels football coaches
Wingate Bulldogs football coaches